The All-Basketball Bundesliga Team – or All-BBL Team – is an annual Basketball Bundesliga (BBL) honor that is bestowed upon the 10 best players in the league, following every Bundesliga season.

All-BBL Teams

References

External links
German League official website 

All-BBL Team